The Love Contract is a 1932 British musical film directed by Herbert Selpin and starring Winifred Shotter, Owen Nares and Sunday Wilshin. The screenplay concerns a young woman who becomes the driver of a wealthy stockbroker who lost her family's savings. It was based on a play by Jean de Letraz, Suzette Desty and Roger Blum. It was produced by Herbert Wilcox's company British & Dominions Film Corporation. Alternate language versions were made in French and in German, both of which were also directed by Selpin.

Cast
 Winifred Shotter as Antoinette 
 Owen Nares as Neville Cardington 
 Sunday Wilshin as Mrs. Savage 
 Miles Malleson as Peters 
 Gibb McLaughlin as Hodge 
 Spencer Trevor as Mr. Savage 
 Frank Harvey as Bank Manager 
 Cosmo Kyrle Bellew as Sir George

References

Bibliography
 Sutton, David R. A chorus of raspberries: British film comedy 1929-1939. University of Exeter Press, 2000.

External links

1932 films
British romantic musical films
Films directed by Herbert Selpin
British films based on plays
British multilingual films
British black-and-white films
British and Dominions Studios films
Films shot at Imperial Studios, Elstree
1930s romantic musical films
1932 multilingual films
1930s English-language films
1930s British films